Manganese fluoride can refer to:

Manganese(II) fluoride, MnF2
Manganese(III) fluoride, MnF3
Manganese(IV) fluoride, MnF4